Daúd Jared Gazale Álvarez (born 10 August 1984) is a Chilean footballer of Palestinian descent who plays for General Velásquez in the Segunda División Profesional de Chile as a forward.

Club career

Deportes Concepción
Gazale began his career in Huachipato, making his debut in that same team, but his professional debut would not be up until 2004 with Deportes Concepción. He is a very skillful forward, with a lot of speed, and strength, great ball control, goal scorer, and play maker. He is the new southern promise among his generation.

Colo-Colo
In 2008, he received many offers from other clubs. He gained European interest from French club Paris Saint-Germain and Spanish club Real Betis. He also received offers from three major Chilean clubs, Universidad Católica, Universidad de Chile and Colo-Colo. He finally signed a four-year deal with Colo-Colo in a deal worth 400,000 US$.

He scored his first goal with Colo-Colo on 25 June 2008 against Club de Fútbol Universidad de Chile at the stadium Tierra de Campeones in Iquique playing for the "Copa Gato". The next day, 26 June, he was presented at Estadio Monumental together with Macnelly Torres and Luis Pedro Figueroa as new additions to the Colo-Colo squad.

Universidad Católica
On 17 August 2011, it was confirmed that he joined Universidad Católica as a free agent on a one-year deal. Gazale made his debut on 23 August 2011 coming on as a second-half substitute for Kevin Harbottle against O'Higgins. On 16 November 2011, he scored his first goal for Católica in the Copa Chile second leg final against Magallanes, giving the title to the club of Las Condes after sixteen years and also the qualification to the Copa Sudamericana of the next season and winning his first trophy at the team. Two days later, was confirmed his ankle injury after the game, due to a strong kick of the striker of Magallanes, David Córdova.

After 133 days without play, on 28 March of the next season, he re-appeared against Unión Española in a 2012 Copa Libertadores game, in which he scored the victory goal in the 87th minute, scoring also the following week in a 5–1 home victory over Cobreloa at San Carlos de Apoquindo.

FC Oțelul Galați
On 20 December 2012, it was confirmed that he joined Romanian FC Oțelul Galați as a free agent on a two-year deal. However, few months later, he terminated his contract because he did not receive his regular salary.

Dorados de Sinaloa
On 6 September 2013, Gazale joined Ascenso MX side Dorados de Sinaloa.

International career
The great season that Gazale had with Deportes Concepción gave him a lot of notice, being that Eduardo Berizzo nominated him to play for the Chile U23 that played a tournament for Under-23 players in Malaysia.

The idea of the coaching staff is for him to adapt himself to the coaching work of Marcelo Bielsa for a future nomination for the 2010 World Cup qualifiers.

Honours

Club
Colo-Colo
Primera División de Chile (2): 2008 Clausura, 2009 Clausura

Universidad Católica
Copa Chile: 2011

Hilal Al-Quds
West Bank Premier League (1): 2018–19

References

External links
 
 

1984 births
Living people
Chilean footballers
Chilean expatriate footballers
Chile international footballers
Chilean people of Palestinian descent
Deportes Concepción (Chile) footballers
Colo-Colo footballers
C.D. Huachipato footballers
Club Deportivo Universidad Católica footballers
ASC Oțelul Galați players
Dorados de Sinaloa footballers
Argentinos Juniors footballers
Nueva Chicago footballers
Audax Italiano footballers
DPMM FC players
Hilal Al-Quds Club players
Naval de Talcahuano footballers
General Velásquez footballers
Chilean Primera División players
Liga I players
Ascenso MX players
Primera Nacional players
Argentine Primera División players
Singapore Premier League players
West Bank Premier League players
Segunda División Profesional de Chile players
Expatriate footballers in Romania
Chilean expatriate sportspeople in Romania
Expatriate footballers in Mexico
Chilean expatriate sportspeople in Mexico
Expatriate footballers in Argentina
Chilean expatriate sportspeople in Argentina
Expatriate footballers in Brunei
Chilean expatriate sportspeople in Brunei
Expatriate footballers in the State of Palestine
Association football forwards
People from Arauco Province